Christopher Preece (birth unknown) is a former professional rugby league footballer who played in the 1980s.

International honours
Chris Preece won a cap for Wales while at Bradford Northern in the 28–9 defeat by England at Eugene Cross Park, Ebbw Vale on Sunday 14 October 1984.

References

Bradford Bulls players
Living people
Place of birth missing (living people)
Rugby league hookers
Wales national rugby league team players
Year of birth missing (living people)